Harry Rowe Shelley (June 8, 1858 – September 12, 1947) was an American composer, organist (church and concert), and professor of music.  Born in New Haven, Connecticut, Shelley studied with Gustave J. Stoeckel at Yale College, Dudley Buck, Max (Wilhelm Carl) Vogrich, and Antonín Dvořák in New York, and completed his musical education in London and Paris.  According to his New York Times obituary, Shelley "penned church music that won him wide popularity.  For 60 years a host of English-speaking peoples throughout the world sang his hymns."

Shelley attended Hopkins Grammar School in New Haven, Connecticut and at fourteen played the organ at Center Church on the Green in New Haven. Although he entered Yale, he did not complete his freshman year.  Shelley was organist at the Church of the Pilgrims during the ministry of Henry Ward Beecher and played at his funeral. Shelley died at age 89 in Short Beach, Connecticut.

Shelley taught at the American Institute of Applied Music, where his students included composers Mabel Madison Watson and Gertrude Hoag Wilson, among others.

Positions held

 1878–1881 — Organist, Church of the Pilgrims, Brooklyn
 1881–1887 — Organist, Plymouth Church (same)
 1887–1899 — Organist, Church of the Pilgrims
 1899–1914 — Organist, Fifth Avenue Baptist Church, New York, which later became Park Avenue Baptist and eventually Riverside Church
 1915–1936 — Organist, Central Congregational Church, Brooklyn
 Faculty member, American Institute of Applied Music

Selected compositions

Among his works are two symphonies; a symphonic poem: The Crusaders; a suite for orchestra: Souvenir de Baden-Baden; sacred cantatas: Vexilla Regis (1893);The Inheritance Divine (1895); Death and Life (1898); a violin concerto; an opera: Leila (manuscript); anthems: The King of Love My Shepherd Is (1886); Hark!, Hark, My Soul (1887); an arrangement for Harriet Beecher Stowe's poem Still, Still with Thee (1930); and other songs and organ pieces.  He also composed the Santa Claus Overture;  and Lochinvar's Ride (1915).

Honors

 1898 — Elected to membership in the National Institute of Arts and Letters

Contemporary recordings 
Shelley, Harry Rowe. "Santa Claus Overture, a lyrical intermezzo." On Those Fabulous Americans. The Symphony Orchestra of America; Matthew B. Phillips, conductor. Albany Records (Troy 103), 1993. Compact disc.

Sources 

 Grove's Dictionary of Music and Musicians (Grove II), 6: 1920 American Supplement, 361.
 New York Times, obituary, September 13, 1947, 11.

External links 

 Some biographical information
 Free Harry Rowe Shelley sheet music from the Ball State University Digital Media Repository

1858 births
1947 deaths
American male classical composers
American classical composers
American opera composers
Male opera composers
Members of the American Academy of Arts and Letters
Hopkins School alumni
Yale College alumni
American classical organists
American male organists
Male classical organists